The 2014–15 Lega Pro was the first season of the unified Lega Pro division in place of the old Prima Divisione and Seconda Divisione. The league is composed of 60 teams divided into three different groups of 20 each.

Teams 
A total of 60 teams will contest the league, divided into three groups of 20 teams. Originally, teams would include 4 sides relegated from the 2013–14 Serie B season, 29 sides playing the 2013–14 Prima Divisione season, 18 sides playing the 2013–14 Seconda Divisione season, and 9 sides promoted from the 2013–14 Serie D season. In the middle of last season Nocerina was expelled from Lega Pro (on 1 August was admitted to Eccellenza); on 15 July 2014 CoViSoc expelled Padova and Viareggio due to financial reasons; on 1 August 2014 FIGC admitted 3 teams that were relegated in the last season, thus the league included 3 sides from 2013–14 Serie B, 27 sides from 2013–14 Prima Divisione, 21 sides from 2013–14 Seconda Divisione and 9 sides from 2013–14 Serie D.

On 13 June 2014, 59 teams had mathematically achieved qualification for the 2014–15 season.

On 1 July 2014, all 59 teams had submitted the application for a license for 2014–15 season, with 8 teams did not submit the required bank guarantee, including Padova. Moreover, Viareggio submitted a guarantee that would not comply with the new regulation passed in May 2014. Correggese, the Serie D playoffs winner, did not submit an application.

On 15 July 2014, the deadline of submission, Padova failed to submit the bank guarantee and were declared bankrupt, while 7 teams had submitted in time. On 18 July 2014 the appeal of Viareggio to the exclusion had failed.

On 1 August 2014 the Federal Council admitted to Lega Pro Aversa Normanna, Martina Franca and Torres, the 3 teams relegated in 2013–14 Seconda Divisione. One more vacancy was created in August after the Italian National Olympic Committee Court of Appeal agreed upon an appeal from Novara, who requested the 2014–15 Serie B season should feature an even number of teams (22) instead of the originally scheduled 21 ones; after this appeal from Novara, Vicenza was admitted to 2014–15 Serie B and Arezzo replaced it in Lega Pro group A.

Group A, North and Sardinia
 AlbinoLeffe, from Prima Divisione, Girone A
 Alessandria, from Seconda Divisione, Girone A
 Arezzo, from Serie D, Girone E
 Bassano Virtus, from Seconda Divisione, Girone A
 Como, from Prima Divisione, Girone A
 Cremonese, from Prima Divisione, Girone A
 FeralpiSalò, from Prima Divisione, Girone A
 Giana Erminio, from Serie D, Girone A
 Lumezzane, from Prima Divisione, Girone A
 Mantova, from Seconda Divisione, Girone A
 Monza, from Seconda Divisione, Girone A
 Novara, from Serie B
 Pavia, from Prima Divisione, Girone A
 Pordenone, from Serie D, Girone C
 Pro Patria, from Prima Divisione, Girone A
 Real Vicenza, from Seconda Divisione, Girone A
 Renate, from Seconda Divisione, Girone A
 Südtirol, from Prima Divisione, Girone A
 Torres, from Seconda Divisione, Girone A
 Venezia, from Prima Divisione, Girone A

Group B, North and Central
 Ancona, from Serie D, Girone F
 Ascoli, from Prima Divisione, Girone B
 Carrarese, from Prima Divisione, Girone A
 Forlì, from Seconda Divisione, Girone A
 Grosseto, from Prima Divisione, Girone B
 Gubbio, from Prima Divisione, Girone B
 L'Aquila, from Prima Divisione, Girone B
 Lucchese, from Serie D, Girone D
 Pisa, from Prima Divisione, Girone B
 Pistoiese, from Serie D, Girone E
 Pontedera, from Prima Divisione, Girone B
 Prato, from Prima Divisione, Girone B
 Pro Piacenza, from Serie D, Girone B
 Reggiana, from Prima Divisione, Girone A
 San Marino, from Prima Divisione, Girone A
 Santarcangelo, from Seconda Divisione, Girone A
 Savona, from Prima Divisione, Girone A
 SPAL, from Seconda Divisione, Girone A
 Teramo, from Seconda Divisione, Girone B
 Tuttocuoio, from Seconda Divisione, Girone B

Group C, South
 Aversa Normanna, from Seconda Divisione, Girone B
 Barletta, from Prima Divisione, Girone B
 Benevento, from Prima Divisione, Girone B
 Casertana, from Seconda Divisione, Girone B
 Catanzaro, from Prima Divisione, Girone B
 Cosenza, from Seconda Divisione, Girone B
 Foggia, from Seconda Divisione, Girone B
 Ischia, from Seconda Divisione, Girone B
 Juve Stabia, from Serie B
 Lupa Roma, from Serie D, Girone G
 Lecce, from Prima Divisione, Girone B
 Martina Franca, from Seconda Divisione, Girone B
 Matera, from Serie D, Girone H
 Melfi, from Seconda Divisione, Girone B
 Messina, from Seconda Divisione, Girone B
 Paganese, from Prima Divisione, Girone B
 Reggina, from Serie B
 Salernitana, from Prima Divisione, Girone B
 Savoia, from Serie D, Girone I
 Vigor Lamezia, from Seconda Divisione, Girone B

Stadia and locations
Note: Table lists in alphabetical order.

Group A (North and Sardinia)

1Giana Erminio played most of the season in the Stadio Brianteo in Monza while their home stadium was renovated.

Group B (North and Central)

Group C (South)

League tables

Group A (North and Sardinia)

Group B (North and Central)

Group C (South)

Promotion play-offs

Preliminary phase

Final phase
Semifinals on 24 and 31 May 2015, finals on 7 and 14 June 2015.

Como promoted to Serie B.

Relegation play-offs
First legs on 23 May 2015 (Reggina-Messina on 26 May), return legs on 30 May 2015.

References 

Serie C seasons
Italy
3